The Femme Fatales are a fictional group of female characters appearing in American comic books published by Marvel Comics. They are often depicted as antagonists to the superhero character Spider-Man and Captain America.

Fictional team history
The Femme Fatales are villains and mutants that serve as mercenaries for hire. Group members Bloodlust and Whiplash have a history of working together prior to joining the Femme Fatales, as members of a previous group called the Band of Baddies. They were hired by fellow villain the Chameleon in the disguise of Dr. Turner to threaten an ambassador. Spider-Man intervened and saved the ambassador, making him an enemy of the Femme Fatales. They then joined forces with other villains the Scorpion and the Tarantula, but all of them were defeated by Spider-Man and his ally the Black Cat. Though the villains got away.

The Femme Fatales later received an invitation to join Superia and her organization of female criminals, the Femizons. They accepted, and battled Captain America and the Paladin in the process.

The group would splinter and disband sometime later: Bloodlust and Whiplash was seen at the A.I.M. Weapons Expo.

Bloodlust later lost her powers after Decimation. Mindblast, who retained her powers, briefly allied herself with Hammerhead during the "Civil War" storyline.

During the "Avengers: Standoff!" storyline, Bloodlust and Mindblast were turned into duplicate Maria Hills through the powers of Kobik in order to keep the Avengers away from Pleasant Hill.

During the "Hunt for Wolverine" storyline, the Femme Fatales are joined by Viper and Sapphire Styx, with Whiplash changing her name to Snake Whip. The Fatales ambush Kitty Pryde, Rogue, Domino, Jubilee and Psylocke at the King's Impresario Restaurant at Hightown, Madripoor. Soon joined by Magneto, himself recently taken captive by the Fatales, the X-Men combat the Femme Fatales; during the encounter Sapphire Styx uses her lifeforce-draining ability on Psylocke, but this later backfires and Sapphire Styx is destroyed, enabling Psylocke to create a new body for herself from Sapphire's soul power. Viper gets away with Magneto pursuing her, and the Femme Fatales are locked up.

Members

Other versions
The Femme Fatales also exist as a team in the Ultimate Marvel universe. Bloodlust, Knockout, Mindblast and Whiplash briefly encounter the All-New Ultimates.

In other media
In Marvel: Ultimate Alliance, Femme Fatales is a team bonus for any four-person combination of Storm, Elektra, Spider-Woman, Invisible Woman, and Ms. Marvel.

In Marvel: Future Fight, Femme Fatales is a team bonus composed of Elektra, Black Cat, and Black Widow.

See also
List of Marvel Comics characters

References

External links
 Femme Fatales (Superia's Femizons, Spider-Man foes)

Marvel Comics supervillain teams
Spider-Man characters
Marvel Comics female supervillains